Watermelon mosaic virus (WMV) also known as Marrow mosaic virus (Raychaudhuri and Varma, 1975; Varma, 1988), Melon mosaic virus (Iwaki et al., 1984; Komuro, 1962), and until recently Watermelon mosaic virus type 2 (WMV-2), is a plant pathogenic virus that causes viral infection (sometimes referred to as watermelon Mosaic disease) in many different plants. The virus itself is referred to as Watermelon Mosaic Virus II or WMV-2 and is an isolate of the U.S. WMV-2 is a ssRNA positive strand virus that is part of the Potyviridae or Potyvirus clade. Like all RNA viruses, it contains a protein capsid which protects the inner viral RNA. First described on squash in Florida, WMV arose from a unique recombination of genetic material contributed by Soybean mosaic virus (SMV) and Bean common mosaic virus (BCMV) along with Peanut Stripe virus (PSV).

Biology 
WMV is a potyvirus whose particles are 760 nm long flexuous rods which has a single strand of RNA. This particular genome structure closely relates WMV to other crop viruses such as Zucchini yellow mosaic virus (ZYMV) and Papaya ringspot virus (PRSV). In its hosts, WMV induces cylindrical inclusions in the cytoplasm which damages the host's tissue. This virus is primarily transmitted non-persistently by many species of aphids and can take most members of the Cucurbitacea family and many leguminous species as hosts. The virus is more common in temperate regions as well as in the tropics though it has been reported in most countries where cucurbits are grown. Recently, WMV has been the cause of severe economic losses to crop yields of cucurbitaceous, leguminous, malvaceous and chenopodiaceous plants in temperate and Mediterranean regions.

Host range and symptoms 
Watermelon mosaic virus is best known for causing disease in most cucurbits and some legumes, though experimentally it has been shown to have a broader host range than almost all other potyviruses. This host range includes more than 170 different plant species from 27 different families.

The symptoms of infection can vary depending on the species of the host, the cultivar, environmental factors and strains of the virus, but the main symptoms to look for are mottling and mosaic. For example, watermelon mosaic causes systemic mosaic and occasional leaf malformation in Cucurbita pepo, a type of squash, while causing necrotic local lesions, systemic mottling, and necrosis when infecting Pisum sativum or mosaic lesions and fruit distortion in Citrullus lanatus. Some of the more common symptoms are chlorotic rings, leaf rugosity and green mosaic. WMV induces mosaic on Nicotiana benthamiana and chlorotic local lesions on Chenopodium amaranticolor, two of its diagnostic plant species. Sometimes, the virus can be recognized by the intensity of symptoms caused in susceptible hosts.

Transmission and control 
Watermelon mosaic virus can be transmitted in multiple ways including vector transmission or physical interactions of a person or tool, but the primary means of transmission is through aphids. At least 29 species of aphid, including Aphis gossypii and Aphis craccivora, are known to have the ability to vector the virus. Aphids pick up the plant virus during probing and transmit it non-persistently to other hosts for a period of time up to a few hours after contact. Because the transmission is non-persistent, pesticides do not provide effective control of the virus unless used as a preventative measure to reduce aphid populations. After the virus is found in fields, aphids could potentially spread it to new hosts before the pesticides eliminate the aphids.

Besides the preventative use of insecticides, the application of mineral oil sprays has been shown to interfere with virus transmission and can be an effective control. Cultural practices such as crop rotation have also been found to be fairly effective methods of avoidance.

Pathogen identification methods 
The symptoms of viruses, no matter what host or strain, mainly cause mosaic and rugosity; therefore, there is no accurate way to determine what virus may be the cause of the disease just by looking at the symptoms.  Most farmers do not have the right equipment to determine the virus responsible for the disease in their fields. Because of this, companies have developed kits that are able to identify the WMV-2 virus as well as other viruses. One of such kits, called ELISA (Enzyme-linked immunosorbent assay) uses an antibody that specifically recognizes WMV. Besides that, specific primers had been designed for molecular WMV detection by RT-PCR.

References

Bibliography 
Iwaki, M., Honda, Y., Hanada, K., Tochihara, H., Yonaha, T., Hokama, K. and Yokoyama, T. (1984). Plant Dis. 68: 1006.
Raychaudhuri, M. and Varma, A. (1975). Indian J. Ent. 37: 247.
Zitter, T. A., Donald L. Hopkins, and Claude E. Thomas. Compendium of Cucurbit Diseases. (1996). St. Paul, MN: APS,. Print.

External links 

 WMV-2 Genome
 Plant Viruses Online Database on Watermelon Mosaic 2
 Mosaic Virus Disease of Vine Crops Fact Sheet
 Description of Plant Viruses on WMV-2
 Neogeneurope Diagnostic
 Vegetable MD Online
 MSU on WMV-2 in Winter Squash 
 Plant Infection

Viral plant pathogens and diseases
Potyviruses
Watermelons